Polynoncus seymourensis is a species of hide beetle in the subfamily Omorginae found in the Galapagos Islands.

References

seymourensis
Beetles described in 1925
Beetles of South America